Andy Murray defeated Roger Federer in the final, 6–3, 6–2 to win the singles tennis title at the 2010 Shanghai Masters.

Nikolay Davydenko was the defending champion, but lost in the second round to Mischa Zverev.

Rafael Nadal's loss in the third round ended his record streak of 21 consecutive Masters 1000 quarterfinals.

Seeds
The top eight seeds receive a bye into the second round.

Main draw

Finals

Top half

Section 1

Section 2

Bottom half

Section 3

Section 4

Qualifying rounds

Seeds

Qualifiers

Lucky loser

Qualifying draw

First qualifier

Second qualifier

Third qualifier

Fourth qualifier

Fifth qualifier

Sixth qualifier

Seventh qualifier

References
General

Specific

Shanghai Rolex Masters 1000
2010 Shanghai Rolex Masters